The men's 400 metres hurdles at the 2022 European Athletics Championships will take place at the Olympiastadion on 17, 18 and 19 August.

Records

Schedule

Results

Round 1
First 3 in each heat (Q) and the next 2 fastest  (q) advanced to the Semifinals.The 10 highest ranked athletes received a bye into the semifinals

Semifinals
First 2 in each semifinal (Q) and the next 2 fastest (q) advance to the Final.

Final

References

Hurdles 400 M
400 metres hurdles at the European Athletics Championships